Raoul Serres (1881–1971) was a French illustrator and printmaker.

1881 births
1971 deaths
French illustrators
French printmakers
Prix de Rome for engraving
French stamp designers